GSK1016790A (aka GSK101) is a drug developed by GlaxoSmithKline which acts as a potent and selective agonist for the TRPV4 receptor. It has been used to study the role of TRPV4 receptors in the function of smooth muscle tissue, particularly that lining blood vessels, lymphatic system, and the bladder.

References 

Piperazines